Brothers is a Norwegian Hip Hop/Rock/Funk band that had an international #1 in 1993 with their cover of AC/DC's "Back in Black".

Discography

Singles

Albums

Norwegian musical groups
Norwegian hip hop groups